General Talan or General Yuusuf Talan or just Yuusuf Talan,, was a General of the SNA, the Somali National Army.

Biography 
Talan was a native of the Awdal region of Somaliland  and a member of the Musafin (Musafiin), Habr 'Affan (Habar Cafaan) section of the  Gadabursi (Gadabuursi) clan. In his early years as career soldier who loved
his profession. Trained at Sandhurst, Britain, he returned to the Somali
Republic in the early sixties. Henceforth, his life went hand in glove with
the fledgling Somali State and he served it with dignity, dedication and selflessness. He went through the ranks of the military till he reached the highest echelon of the Somali military hierarchy. A ceremony was held at the Center of the Military officers in Mogadishu to formalize it. The  military officers there welcomed him with a five-minute standing ovation.

During the regime of Siad Barre he was a brigadier-general.

Death 
General Talan was killed in a drive by shooting in Mogadishu in 2000.

References 

2000 deaths
Somalian generals
Gadabuursi
People from Awdal